Romas Dalinkevičius  (April 9, 1950 Kaunas -  November 3, 2001 Vilnius) was a Lithuanian painter.

Biography
He graduated from the Lithuanian Institute of Fine Arts, where his teachers were Veiverytė Sofia, Kazimierz Morkunas and Leopold Surgailis .

Lithuanian Institute of Art (since 1990 at the Vilnius Academy of Fine Arts), lecturer, 1989 - 1993 on ir 1995–2001 m. and 1995 - 2001 of Monumental art department head from 1988 on docentas. Assoc.

Works
Since 1973, he participated in several art exhibitions:

 Vilnius - 1975–1976, 1990, 1993–94, 2000
 USSR - 1985, 1995
 Luxembourg - In 1986–87, 1989
 USA - 1989
 Switzerland - 1991, 1995
 Gallery "Akademija" 2010

See also
List of Lithuanian painters
Universal Lithuanian Encyclopedia

References

1950 births
2001 deaths
Artists from Kaunas
20th-century Lithuanian painters